In enzymology, a thiophene-2-carbonyl-CoA monooxygenase is an enzyme that catalyzes the chemical reaction

thiophene-2-carbonyl-CoA + AH2 + O2  5-hydroxythiophene-2-carbonyl-CoA + A + H2O

The three substrates of this enzyme are thiophene-2-carbonyl-CoA, an electron acceptor AH2, and O2.  Its three products are 5-hydroxythiophene-2-carbonyl-CoA, the reduction product A, and H2O.

This enzyme belongs to the family of oxidoreductases, specifically those acting on paired donors, with O2 as oxidant and incorporation or reduction of oxygen. The oxygen incorporated need not be derived from O miscellaneous.  The systematic name of this enzyme class is thiophene-2-carbonyl-CoA, hydrogen-donor:oxygen oxidoreductase. Other names in common use include thiophene-2-carboxyl-CoA dehydrogenase, thiophene-2-carboxyl-CoA hydroxylase, and thiophene-2-carboxyl-CoA monooxygenase.

References

 

EC 1.14.99
Enzymes of unknown structure